Bridgeview, Illinois is a suburb of Chicago, United States.

Bridgeview may also refer to:

Canada 

 Bridgeview, Alberta
 Bridgeview, Surrey, British Columbia
 Bridgeview, Nova Scotia

United States 

 Bridgeview/Greenlawn, Baltimore
 Bridgeview Vineyard and Winery, Oregon
 BridgeView (San Francisco)

See also 

 Bridge View Inn

Place name disambiguation pages